2nd Training Centre  (Polish: 2 Osrodek Szkolenia Lotniczego - 2.OSL) is a training unit of Polish Air Force. Unit is stationed in 1st Airport Station in Radom and operates PZL-130 trainer.

See also
1st Tactical Squadron
3rd Tactical Squadron
7th Tactical Squadron
8th Tactical Squadron
10th Tactical Squadron
41st Tactical Squadron
2nd Airlift Squadron
13th Airlift Squadron
14th Airlift Squadron
36th Special Aviation Regiment

Military units and formations of the Polish Air Force